Meriola is a genus of araneomorph spiders in the family Trachelidae, first described by Nathan Banks in 1895.

Species
 it contains twenty-four species, three from the United States and Canada:
Meriola arcifera (Simon, 1886) – Chile, Bolivia, Argentina. Introduced to USA (California, Hawaii)
Meriola balcarce Platnick & Ewing, 1995 – Argentina
Meriola barrosi (Mello-Leitão, 1951) – Chile, Argentina
Meriola californica (Banks, 1904) – USA (Pacific Coast and Baja California), Mexico
Meriola cetiformis (Strand, 1908) – Peru, Brazil, Bolivia, Chile, Argentina
Meriola davidi Grismado, 2004 – Argentina
Meriola decepta Banks, 1895 (type) – Eastern to Midwest United States & south to Guatemala, Colombia, Ecuador, Peru, Brazil
Meriola fasciata (Mello-Leitão, 1941) – Brazil, Argentina
Meriola foraminosa (Keyserling, 1891) – Venezuela to Chile
Meriola gallina Platnick & Ewing, 1995 – Chile
Meriola goloboffi Platnick & Ewing, 1995 – Argentina
Meriola hyltonae (Mello-Leitão, 1940) – Brazil, Argentina
Meriola longitarsis (Simon, 1904) – Chile, Argentina
Meriola manuel Platnick & Ewing, 1995 – Chile
Meriola mauryi Platnick & Ewing, 1995 – Argentina
Meriola nague Platnick & Ewing, 1995 – Chile
Meriola penai Platnick & Ewing, 1995 – Chile, Argentina
Meriola puyehue Platnick & Ewing, 1995 – Chile, Argentina
Meriola quilicura Platnick & Ewing, 1995 – Chile
Meriola rahue Platnick & Ewing, 1995 – Argentina
Meriola ramirezi Platnick & Ewing, 1995 – Argentina
Meriola tablas Platnick & Ewing, 1995 – Chile, Argentina
Meriola teresita Platnick & Ewing, 1995 – Argentina
Meriola virgata (Simon, 1904) – Chile

References

Araneomorphae genera
Taxa named by Nathan Banks
Trachelidae